This is a list of the 44 species of Nemertea (ribbon worms, proboscis worms) found in Ireland.

Family Amphiporidae 
Amphiporus bioculatus McIntosh, 1874
Amphiporus lactifloreus (Johnston, 1828)

Family Cephalothricidae
Cephalothrix rufifrons (Johnston, 1837)
Cephalothrix filiformis Johnston, 1828

Family Lineidae 
Cerebratulus fuscus (McIntosh, 1874)
Cerebratulus marginatus Renier, 1804
Lineus acutifrons Southern, 1913
Lineus longissimus (Gunnerus, 1770)
Lineus ruber (Müller, 1774)
Lineus viridis (Müller, 1774)
Micrura fasciolata Ehrenberg, 1828
Micrura purpurea (Dalyell, 1853)
Ramphogordius lacteus Rathke, 1843

Family Emplectonematidae
Emplectonema gracile (Johnston, 1837)
Nemertopsis flavida (McIntosh, 1873/74)

Family Cratenemertidae 
Nipponnemertes pulchra (Johnston, 1837)

Family Oerstediidae
Oerstedia dorsalis (Abildgaard, 1806)

Family Paradrepanophoridae
Paradrepanophorus crassus (Quatrefages, 1846)

Family Drepanophoridae 
Punnettia splendida (Keferstein, 1862)

Family Tetrastemmatidae
Tetrastemma beaumonti (Southern, 1913)
Tetrastemma candidum (Müller, 1774)
Tetrastemma cephalophorum Bürger, 1895
Tetrastemma coronatum (Quatrefages, 1846)
Tetrastemma flavidum Ehrenberg, 1828
Tetrastemma helvolum Bürger, 1895
Tetrastemma melanocephalum (Johnston, 1837)
Tetrastemma robertianae McIntosh, 1874
Tetrastemma vermiculus (Quatrefages, 1846)

Family Tubulanidae
Tubulanus annulatus (Montagu, 1804)
Tubulanus banyulensis (Joubin, 1890)
Tubulanus inexpectatus (Hubrecht, 1880)
Tubulanus linearis (McIntosh, 1874)
Tubulanus superbus (Kölliker, 1845)

References

Ireland, nemertea
nemer